Hemitrochus is a genus of air-breathing land snails, terrestrial pulmonate gastropod mollusks in the family Xanthonychidae/Cepolidae.

Genera
Species within the genus Hemitrochus include:
 Hemitrochus lucipeta
 Hemitrochus varians (Menke, 1829)
 ...

References

External links